Samuel Hewlings Chisholm AO (8 October 1939 – 9 July 2018) was a New Zealand-born Australian media executive who was a significant figure in the Australian media.

Career 
Chisholm attended King's College, Auckland. 

Chisholm had been for several years the sales director of Kerry Packer's Channel Nine before he was appointed Managing Director in 1977. The network was taken over by Alan Bond in 1988. In mid 1990 he moved to the UK to work for Packer's rival Rupert Murdoch, rescuing the newly established British Sky Broadcasting BSkyB from financial problems after the merger of Sky and British Satellite Broadcasting. In 2000 he returned to Australia and in 2003 received a double lung transplant. In 2005 at the request of Kerry Packer he returned briefly to the Nine Network as Acting Chief Executive.

Awards
On 25 November 2013 he was appointed an Honorary Officer of the Order of Australia.
On 19 February 2014 he was awarded the King's College honours tie in Auckland, New Zealand for outstanding achievement in his selected career.

Benefactor
When leading Australian television personality Graham Kennedy became ill in his later years, an anonymous benefactor came forward and donated a substantial sum (reported to be 150,000) for Kennedy's ongoing support and health care.  On 27 May 2005, two days after Kennedy's death, his close friend and carer Noeline Brown confirmed that the benefactor was Sam Chisholm.

Death
Chisholm died on 9 July 2018, after a short battle with an illness, with his wife Sue and daughter Caroline by his side.

References

External links
Sam Chisholm at Bloomberg Businessweek
Sam Chisholm, Return of the great sacker, Raymond Snoddy, The Independent, 5 December 2005

1939 births
2018 deaths
Australian media executives
Honorary Officers of the Order of Australia
Logie Award winners
Lung transplant recipients
People educated at King's College, Auckland